Infanta Maria Teresa of Braganza ( or ; 29 April 1793 – 17 January 1874) was the firstborn child of John VI of Portugal and Carlota Joaquina of Spain.

Early life 
Maria Teresa Francisca de Assis Antónia Carlota Joana Josefa Xavier de Paula Micaela Rafaela Isabel Gonzaga was born in Ajuda, Lisbon, in 1793 during the reign of her grandmother Queen Maria I. Maria Teresa was the eldest child of the Prince and Princess of Brazil (later King John VI and Carlota Joaquina). Her mother was the daughter of Charles IV of Spain. As the eldest child of the heir apparent, Maria Teresa was granted the title Princess of Beira, which she held until her brother Francisco António was born in 1795.

Marriage 

She was married on 13 May 1810 in Rio de Janeiro (where the royal family was exiled because of the Napoleonic wars) to her cousin Infante Pedro Carlos, Prince of Spain and Portugal. She was widowed on 26 May 1812, soon after giving birth to her only child, a son, Infante Sebastian of Portugal and Spain (1811–1875).

Very conservative, she was an ally of her younger brother Miguel I of Portugal in his attempts to obtain the throne of Portugal (civil war 1826–1834), and of her brother-in-law and uncle Infante Don Carlos, Count of Molina in his attempts to obtain the Spanish throne. In the last years of the reign of her uncle Ferdinand VII of Spain (died 1833), Teresa lived in Madrid and plotted to strengthen Don Carlos' position in succession. She participated in the First Carlist War (1833–1839), being a leading supporter of Carlism, church and reactionary interests. Her sister Francisca, Titular Queen of Spain, wife of Carlos, died in 1834.

Spanish succession 
On 15 January 1837, the Cortes of Spain legislated her excluded from the Spanish succession, rights belonging to her in descent from her mother, on grounds of her being a rebel along with Don Carlos. Her son Sebastian's rights were similarly excluded, but he was later, in 1859, restored in Spain. Also don Carlos' sons and Teresa's brother Miguel I of Portugal were excluded at the same law.

The next year she married again, in 1838, to her brother-in-law, uncle and longtime ally, Infante Carlos of Spain (1788–1855), whom she viewed as the rightful king of Spain; the widower of her sister Maria Francisca. The second marriage remained childless, but she took care of her stepsons, who were also her nephews and cousins.

They soon left Spain because of unsuccess in the civil war, and never returned. She died in Trieste on 17 January 1874, having survived her second husband by nineteen years.

Honours
  Dame Grand Cross of the Order of the Immaculate Conception of Vila Viçosa
  Dame of the Order of Queen Saint Isabel
  Dame of the Order of Queen Maria Luisa

Ancestry

References 

La Princesa de Beira y los Hijos de Don Carlos by Conde de Rodezno (1938)

|-

|-

1793 births
1874 deaths
Portuguese infantas
House of Bourbon-Braganza
House of Braganza
People from Lisbon
18th-century Portuguese people
19th-century Portuguese people
18th-century Portuguese women
19th-century Portuguese women
Dames of the Order of Saint Isabel
Knights Grand Cross of the Order of the Immaculate Conception of Vila Viçosa
Daughters of kings